Bertrand Besigye (born 24 October 1972 in Kampala, Uganda) is a Norwegian writer. He made his debut in 1993 with the poetry collection Og du dør så langsomt at du tror du lever, for which he won the Tarjei Vesaas' debutantpris.

Bibliography 
Og du dør så langsomt at du tror du lever – poetry, 1993
Krystallisert sollys – poetry, 2003
Svastikastjernen – novel, 2004
Og Solen Tilber Ingen Andre Guder Enn Sin Egen Styrke – poetry, 2010

References
 Bertrand Besigye in NRK Forfatter
 Bertrand Besigye in Dagbladet Forfatter
 Bertrand Besigye in Aftenposten Alex

1972 births
Living people
People from Kampala
21st-century Norwegian novelists
Norwegian male novelists
Norwegian male poets
20th-century Norwegian poets
Ugandan emigrants to Norway
21st-century Norwegian poets
20th-century Norwegian male writers
21st-century Norwegian male writers